Naana Eyiah is a member of parliament for the constituency. She was elected on the ticket of the New Patriotic Party (Ghana)|New Patriotic Party (NPP) and won a majority of 14,178 votes to become the MP. She succeeded Rachel Florence Appoh who had represented the constituency in the same year on the ticket of the National Democratic Congress (NDC) with minority votes of 12,858.

Members of Parliament

Boundaries 
The seat is within the Gomoaman Traditional area and shares boundaries with Gomoa East and Gomoa West Districts and Agona West Municipal all in the Central Region of Ghana.

References 

Parliamentary constituencies in the Central Region (Ghana)